Ilya Semyonovich Lapidus (Ukrainian: Ілля Семенович Лапідус, Russian: Илья Семёнович Лапидус; born March 7, 1998) is a Ukrainian singer, songwriter, rap and hip hop artist, better known as ZippO.

Biography 
Ilya was born on March 7, 1998, in the Ukrainian city of Nikolaev. After the family moved to Kyiv, where he still lives. Ilya began to engage in creativity from childhood. He wrote his first song at the age of 10.

At the age of 14, while still a schoolboy, he took the pseudonym ZippO (after the name of the famous brand of lighters) and releases a new song that has become popular on the Internet.

In 2013, when Ilya was 15 years old, he released his first album, called "Unforgettable".

Discography 

 2013 — «Незабываемо» (Unforgettably)
 2014 — «Фитиль» (Wick) 
 2021 — «Фитиль-2» (Wick-2)

References 

Living people
1998 births
Ukrainian singer-songwriters
Ukrainian hip hop musicians